The European Assembly for Climate Justice took place in Brussels from 26 to 29 November 2010.

Over 250 people from ten European countries assembled for four days of debates, discussion, action and networking.

Motivation
The Assembly was organised following a call out from Via Campesina for 1000 Cancuns where people across the world would organise popular assemblies in the run up to the COP16.

Activities

Critical mass bike ride
Events began on Friday 26th when 120 cyclists gathered for a critical mass ride around central Brussels.

Workshops, general assembly and conference
On Saturday and Sunday morning participants gathered at Erasmus Hogeschool for workshops, a popular assembly and a conference.

Sing for the Climate
On Sunday afternoon participants joined the climate justice bloc in the "Sing for the Climate" event which was organised by the Belgian Climate Coalition.

External links
 Website for the European Assembly for Climate Change
 Via Campsenia - 1000 Cancuns

Climate change conferences
International climate change organizations
Environmental justice organizations
Environment of Europe
Events in Brussels
2010 in Brussels
2010 in the environment